Jader Bignamini (born 1976 in Crema, Lombardy, Italy) is an Italian conductor and clarinetist.

As a child, Bignamini became interested in the clarinet.  He formally studied music at the Conservatorio Nicolini Piacenza.  He joined the Orchestra Sinfonica di Milano Giuseppe Verdi (La Verdi) as a clarinetist.  He further developed his interest in conducting whilst a member of La Verdi, and became an assistant conductor of La Verdi in 2010.  He later became associate conductor of La Verdi.  His professional debut as a conductor was at age 28.  He now has the title of resident conductor with La Verdi.  His conducting mentors have included Riccardo Chailly.

In North America, Bignamini first conducted at Santa Fe Opera in July 2015.  His first conducting appearance at the Metropolitan Opera was in November 2017.  In June 2018, Bignamini first guest-conducted the Detroit Symphony Orchestra (BBC NOW), as an emergency substitute for Leonard Slatkin.  He returned to Detroit in October 2019 for a further guest-conducting engagement with the orchestra.  In January 2020, the Detroit Symphony Orchestra announced the appointment of Bignamini as its next music director, effective with the 2020-2021 season, with an initial contract of 6 seasons.  This appointment marks his first music directorship.

Bignamini and his wife Lidia, herself a clarinetist, have two children.  The family resides in Cremona.

References

External links
 Official webpage of Jader Biganmini
 Opus 3 Artists agency page on Jader Bignamini

1976 births
Living people
21st-century Italian conductors (music)
21st-century Italian male musicians
Italian clarinetists
Italian male conductors (music)
People from Crema, Lombardy